Jahnava Devi), also called Jahnava Mata, was the wife of Nityananda and a philosopher and saint from the Gaudiya Vaishnava school of Hindu Vedanta. She became a leading figure in Gaudiya Vaishnavism and a diksa guru and sampradaya head.

Life
Janhava Devi was born in  Ambika Kalna (modern-day Bardhaman district  of West Bengal, India) and spent her childhood there. She is mentioned in Janhaba Astakam: Sri Jiva Goswami, confirming that she was widely known and a cherished figure in the Bhakti movement by about 1600 CE.

See also
Nityananda
Gaudiya Vaishnavism
Chaitanya Mahaprabhu
Pancha Tattva (Vaishnavism)

Further reading
 Jiva Goswami's Tattva-Sandarbha: Sacred India's Philosophy of Ecstasy, by Swami B.V. Tripurari
 Aleksandar Uskokov, “The Long and Short of It: Mahā-vākya from Mīmāmsā to Jīva Gosvāmin, from the Veda to the Bhāgavata,” The Journal of Hindu Studies 11 (2018):38–52.
 Sri Chaitanya: His Life & Associates" by Srila Bhakti Ballabh Tirtha Maharaj
 HOOGLY JELAR ITIHAS  BY SUDHIR KUMAR MITRA
 উদ্ধারণ দত্ত কথামৃত: বৈদ্যনাথ ভৌমিক
 দীননাথ ধর (1904): উদ্ধারণ দত্ত ঠাকুর [সংস্করণ-২].
 Bhakti Ratnakar by Srila Narahari Chakravarti Thakura
 Vrindavan Das Thakur (2001), Chaitanya Bhagavata.
 Gaura-ganoddesha-dipika : Kavi Karnapura
 Murali Vilasa  : Rajavallabha Gosvami
 “পাট পর্যটন” : অভিরাম দাস
 উদ্ধারণপুরের ঘাট : কালিকানন্দ অবধূত
 Murali Vilasa  :  Rajavallabha Gosvami
 Prem Bilash : Nityananda Das
 Nityananda Prabhur Bongshobistar: Vrindavan Das Thakur
 Sri Narottama Vilasa : Srila Narahari Chakravarti
 Anangamanjuri Samputica : Ramchandra Goswami
 Janhabatatwa Mormartho: Goti Gobinda
 Ananga Kodombaboli : Subhadra Devi
 Janhaba Astakam: Sri Jiva Goswami

External links
  
  (iskcondesiretree.info)
 Gaudiya Grantha Mandira (Sanskrit Texts)

References

1509 births
1594 deaths
Bengali philosophers
Scholars from West Bengal
Bengali Hindus
16th-century Bengalis
Devotees of Krishna
16th-century Hindu philosophers and theologians
Kirtan performers
Indian Vaishnavites
16th-century Indian philosophers
People from Purba Bardhaman district
Gaudiya religious leaders
Vaishnava saints